Fritz Heinemann (8 February 1889 – 7 January 1970) was a German philosopher.

Born in Lüneburg, he taught at Frankfurt University from 1930 to 1933. From 1939 to 1956, he taught at Manchester College, Oxford.

Literary works 
 Plotin Forschungen über die plotinische Frage, 1921
 Neue Wege der Philosophie, 1929
 Odysseus oder die Zukunft der Philosophie, 1939

References

External links 
 Cronology of life 

1889 births
1970 deaths
20th-century German philosophers
Jewish philosophers
Jewish emigrants from Nazi Germany to the United Kingdom
People from the Province of Hanover
People from Lüneburg
German male writers